Charly Ollier (born February 18, 1985) is a French professional football player. Currently, he plays in the Championnat de France amateur for ÉDS Montluçon.

He played on the professional level in Ligue 2 for Clermont Foot, making a substitute appearance in May 2005.

His father Alain Ollier played in Ligue 2 for AJ Auxerre, CS Louhans-Cuiseaux and FC Montceau Bourgogne.

References

1985 births
Living people
French footballers
Ligue 2 players
Clermont Foot players
Montluçon Football players
Association football midfielders